Marek Karpinski is a computer scientist and mathematician known for his research in the theory of algorithms and their applications, combinatorial optimization, computational complexity, and mathematical foundations. He is a recipient of several research prizes in the above areas.

He is currently a Professor of Computer Science, and the Head of the Algorithms Group at the University of Bonn. He is also a member of Bonn International Graduate School in Mathematics BIGS and the Hausdorff Center for Mathematics.

See also

 List of computer scientists
 List of mathematicians

References

Theoretical computer scientists
Mathematical logicians
Graph theorists
Academic staff of the University of Bonn
American computer scientists
20th-century Polish mathematicians
21st-century Polish mathematicians
Members of Academia Europaea
Polish computer scientists
Living people
Year of birth missing (living people)